Vsevolod II may refer to:

 Vsevolod II of Kiev (died in 1146)
 Vsevolod Mstislavich of Volhynia (died in 1196)